Toraja Church is a Protestant Christian denomination in Tana Toraja, Indonesia, of which the majority of the Torajan people are members. This church is a member of the Communion of Churches in Indonesia since 1950. On 1912-1913 the Gerevormerde Missionary Bond-Holland of the Dutch Reformed Church begun working in this part of the country. On 7 November 1913, Reverend A.A. van de Loosdrecht became the first missionary who came to Rantepao. This time became the starting point when the Gospel was grown in the Torajanese's heart. But, Reverend van de Loosdrecht was killed in that place. In 1938 there were 14,000 Christians from 300,000 inhabitants there. Formally, Toraja Church was established on 25 March 1947 in Rantepao. In 1995 the church had 300,000 adherents.
In 2012 the church had 400,000 members and 959 congregations. This church is the largest in South Sulawesi, with approximately 80% of the Christian population belong to it.
 It is a member of the World Communion of Reformed Churches.

References

Torajan people
Protestantism in Indonesia
1947 establishments in the Dutch East Indies
Calvinist denominations established in the 20th century
Members of the World Communion of Reformed Churches
Reformed denominations in Indonesia
Religious organizations based in Indonesia
Christian organizations established in 1947
Tana Toraja Regency
North Toraja Regency